The Guernsey Partnership of Independents is a political party in Guernsey founded in 2020 by Gavin St Pier. The party does not impose a whip on its members, and effectively operates as a grouping of independents, per its name.

The party ran 21 candidates in the 2020 Guernsey general election and elected 10.

References 

Political parties in Guernsey
2020 establishments in Guernsey
Political parties established in 2020